Kyle Rideout (born November 9, 1984) is a Canadian actor, writer, and director. He co-owns a production company called Motion 58 with business partner Josh Epstein. He co-wrote and directed the short films Hop the Twig and Wait for Rain as well as the feature films Eadweard and Adventures in Public School. Rideout's film have garnered a nomination for the Directors Guild of Canada's DGC Discovery Award in 2017 for Adventures in Public School.

Early life
Rideout was born in Vancouver, British Columbia on November 9, 1984.

Career
As an actor, Rideout won a Jessie Richardson Theatre Award as Best Newcomer in 2005, for his performance in a production of Josh MacDonald's play Halo. The following year, he won the award for Best Supporting Actor, Small Theatre Division, for his performance as Gordon in David McGillivray and Walter Zerlin's The Farndale Avenue Housing Estate Townswomen's Guild Dramatic Society Production of A Christmas Carol. In 2007, he starred as Romeo in Bard on the Beach's production of Romeo and Juliet.

In 2010, he appeared in Studies in Motion: The Hauntings of Eadweard Muybridge; Eadweard Muybridge, the subject of that play, would also become the subject of Eadweard the film. He also appeared in Minecraft Mini Series as Durango.

Rideout has also had guest roles in Da Vinci's Inquest and Supernatural, and voice roles in Packages from Planet X, Littlest Pet Shop, My Little Pony: Friendship Is Magic, and the English language edition of The Story of Saiunkoku. Rideout is set to voice Russell, an undercover agent from the upcoming CTV drama series Extroverted.

Filmography

Film

Television

References

External links

1984 births
Canadian male television actors
Canadian male film actors
Canadian male stage actors
Canadian male voice actors
Canadian male screenwriters
21st-century Canadian male actors
Male actors from Vancouver
Writers from Vancouver
Living people
Film directors from Vancouver
Canadian male Shakespearean actors
Canadian Film Centre alumni